Anthony William Young (1866–1948) was a part of the pioneer families of the Indian Rive County, Young was a manager at the Indian River Farms Company in 1914 to 1919. He then became the first mayor of Vero Beach, Florida, in June 12, 1919, when the city was first incorporated, to his leave of office in December 14, 1921. He also became the fifth mayor of Vero Beach from December 10, 1935, to December 15, 1937. Young was a member of the Florida House of Representatives from 1921 to 1925, and a member of the Florida Senate from 1929 to 1931. He is considered to be the founder of Indian River County because he was the legislative author of the act which created it by splitting it off from St. Lucie County in 1925.

Early Political Career 
Young had petitioned a bill in May of 1925 that would separate Vero Beach from Fort Pierce and made their own county of Indian River.In June of 1925, Young was elected the first Mayor of Vero Beach, FL.

Further reading 
 TCPalm - A.W. 'Uncle Tony' Young behind county's formation

References 

1866 births
1948 deaths
Democratic Party Florida state senators
Mayors of Vero Beach, Florida
Democratic Party members of the Florida House of Representatives
People from Illinois